This is a list of tunnels documented by the Historic American Engineering Record in the U.S. state of New York.

Tunnels

See also
List of bridges documented by the Historic American Engineering Record in New York

References

List
Tunnels
Tunnels
New York